The Kingdom of Cyprus was a state that existed between 1192 and 1489. It was ruled by the French House of Lusignan. It comprised not only the island of Cyprus, but it also had a foothold on the Anatolian mainland: Antalya between 1361 and 1373, and Corycus between 1361 and 1448.

History

Third Crusade
The island of Cyprus was conquered in 1191 by King Richard I of England during the Third Crusade, from Isaac Komnenos, an upstart local governor, Byzantine Prince and self-proclaimed emperor of the Byzantine Empire. The English king did not intend to conquer the island until his fleet was scattered by a storm en route to the siege of Acre and three of his ships were driven to the shores of Cyprus. The three ships were wrecked and sank in sight of the port of Limassol. The shipwrecked survivors were taken prisoner by Komnenos and when a ship bearing King Richard's sister Joan and bride Berengaria entered the port, Komnenos refused their request to disembark for fresh water. King Richard and the rest of his fleet arrived shortly afterwards. Upon hearing of the imprisonment of his shipwrecked comrades and the insults offered to his bride and sister, King Richard met Komnenos in battle. There were rumours that Komnenos was secretly in agreement with Saladin in order to protect himself from his enemies the Angelos family, the ruling family in the Byzantine capital of Constantinople.

Control of the island of Cyprus would give King Richard a highly strategic base to launch further Crusade initiatives. The English army engaged the Cypriots on the shores of Limassol with English archers and heavily armored knights. Komnenos and the remainder of the army escaped to the hills during nightfall, but King Richard and his troops tracked the Cypriot ruler down and raided his camp before dawn. Komnenos escaped again with a small number of men. The next day, many Cypriot nobles came to King Richard to swear fealty. In the following days, Komnenos made an offer of 20,000 marks of gold and 500 men-at-arms to King Richard, as well as promising to surrender his daughter and castles as a pledge for his good behaviour.

Fearing treachery at the hands of the new invaders, Komnenos fled after making this pledge to King Richard and escaped to the stronghold of Kantara. Some weeks after King Richard's marriage to his bride in Limassol on 12 May 1191, Komnenos attempted an escape by boat to the mainland but he was apprehended in the abbey of Cape St. Andrea at the eastern point of the island and later imprisoned in the castle of Markappos in Syria, where he died shortly afterwards, still in captivity. Meanwhile, King Richard resumed his journey to Acre and, with much needed respite, new funds and reinforcements, set sail for the Holy Land accompanied by the King of Jerusalem, Guy of Lusignan and other high ranking nobles. The English king left garrisons in the towns and castles of the island before he departed and the island itself was left in charge of Richard of Canville and Robert of Thornham.

Richard confiscated the property of those Cypriots who had fought against him. He also imposed a 50% capital levy on the island in return for confirming its laws and customs. He also ordered Cypriot men to shave their beards. There was a rebellion led by a relative of Isaac's, but it was crushed by Robert of Thornham, who hanged the leader. Richard rebuked Robert for this execution, since executing a man who claimed to be king was an affront to royal dignity. Some details of the brief English period on Cyprus can be found in the Chronicle of Meaux Abbey, possibly derived from Robert of Thornham, who had a relationship with the abbey.

Knights Templar
When King Richard I of England realized that Cyprus would prove to be a difficult territory to maintain and oversee whilst launching offensives in the Holy Land, he sold it to the Knights Templar for a fee of 100,000 bezants, 40,000 of which was to be paid immediately, while the remainder was to be paid in installments. One of the greatest military orders of medieval times, the Knights Templar were renowned for their remarkable financial power and vast holdings of land and property throughout Europe and the East. Their severity of rule in Cyprus quickly incurred the hatred of the native population. On Easter Day in 1192, the Cypriots attempted a massacre of their Templar rulers; however, due to prior knowledge of the attack and limited numbers of troops, the Knights had taken refuge in their stronghold at Nicosia. A siege ensued and the Templars, realizing their dire circumstances and their besiegers' reluctance to bargain, sallied out into the streets at dawn one morning, taking the Cypriots completely by surprise. The subsequent slaughter was merciless and widespread and though Templar rule was restored following the event, the military order was reluctant to continue rule and allegedly begged King Richard to take Cyprus back. King Richard took them up on the offer and the Templars returned to Syria, retaining but a few holdings on the island. A small minority Roman Catholic population of the island was mainly confined to some coastal cities, such as Famagusta, as well as inland Nicosia, the traditional capital. Roman Catholics kept the reins of power and control, while the Orthodox inhabitants lived in the countryside; this was much the same as the arrangement in the Kingdom of Jerusalem. The independent Eastern Orthodox Church of Cyprus, with its own Archbishop and subject to no patriarch, was allowed to remain on the island, but the Roman Catholic Latin Church largely displaced it in stature and holding property.

Guy and Amalric

In the meantime, the hereditary queen of Jerusalem, Sybilla, had died, and opposition to the rule of her husband, king consort Guy of Lusignan, greatly increased to the point that he was ousted from his claim to the crown of Jerusalem. Since Guy was a long-time vassal of King Richard, the English king looked to strike two birds with one stone; by offering Guy de Lusignan the kingdom of Cyprus, he allowed his friend the opportunity to save face and keep some sort of power in the East whilst simultaneously ridding himself of a troublesome fief. It is unclear whether King Richard gave him the territory or sold it and it is highly unlikely that King Richard was ever paid, even if a deal was struck.
In 1194, Guy de Lusignan died without any heirs and so his older brother, Amalric, became King Amalric I of Cyprus, a crown and title which was approved by Henry VI, Holy Roman Emperor.

After the death of Amalric of Lusignan, the Kingdom continually passed to a series of young boys who grew up as king. The Ibelin family, which had held much power in Jerusalem prior its downfall, acted as regents during these early years. In 1229, one of the Ibelin regents was forced out of power by Frederick II, Holy Roman Emperor, who brought the struggle between the Guelphs and Ghibellines to the island. Frederick's supporters were defeated in this struggle by 1232 from the Cypriots Forces at Battle of Agridi, although it lasted longer in the Kingdom of Jerusalem and in the Holy Roman Empire. Frederick's Hohenstaufen descendants continued to rule as kings of Jerusalem until 1268 when Hugh III of Cyprus claimed the title and its territory of Acre for himself upon the death of Conrad III of Jerusalem, thus uniting the two kingdoms. The territory in Palestine was finally lost while Henry II was king in 1291, but the kings of Cyprus continued to claim the title.

Governance

Like Jerusalem, Cyprus had a Haute Cour (High Court), although it was less powerful than it had been in Jerusalem. The island was richer and more feudal than Jerusalem, so the king had more personal wealth and could afford to ignore the Haute Cour. The most important vassal family was the multi-branch House of Ibelin. However, the king was often in conflict with the Italian merchants, especially because Cyprus had become the center of European trade with Africa and Asia after the fall of Acre in 1291.

The kingdom eventually came to be dominated more and more in the 14th century by the Genoese merchants. Cyprus therefore sided with the Avignon Papacy in the Great Schism, in the hope that the French would be able to drive out the Italians. The Mameluks then made the kingdom a tributary state in 1426; the remaining monarchs gradually lost almost all independence, until 1489 when the last queen, Catherine Cornaro, was forced to sell the island to Venice.

Economy

The economy of Cyprus remained primarily agrarian during the Lusignan period. Simultaneously, though, the island grew in importance in the trade network connecting Western Europe and the Middle East, serving as an "entrepôt". This led to an increase in demand on Cypriot products (most importantly sugar, but also wine, wheat, oil, carobs) abroad, and the agrarian economy became more export-oriented. This allowed Cyprus to become more prosperous relative to the Byzantine period, fuelling the development of the harbour of Famagusta and the capital Nicosia, enabling the construction of architectural works that survive to this day. Whilst the development of these two eclipsed the other towns, towns such as Limassol, Paphos and Kyrenia did take some part in the changing economic environment. Limassol, in particular, became a port for the export of agricultural products and served as a stopover for Christian pilgrims to the Holy Land. The relative prosperity encouraged migration to Cyprus from the West (Genoa, Venice, Provence, Catalonia) and the East. The Latin immigrants participated in the economic life as merchants, artisans, shipwrights, ship captains and tavern keepers, and as such had an outsize share in the economy.

During this period, new industries also emerged in Cyprus. Cypriot pottery developed particular characteristics, and was exported to the Crusader States until the Fall of Acre in 1291. In the late 13th and early 14th industries, the textile industry developed, with new textile dyeing workshops being set up in Nicosia, and Cypriot samites and camlets having increasing demand in the West and the East. Famagusta became a hub for shipbuilding. These developments prompted the arrival of representatives from Florentine banking houses, such as the Peruzzi and the Bardi family. The growth of the industry as well as the labour-intensive production of sugar and wine resulted in a demand for slaves, and slave markets existed in Nicosia and Famagusta.

Society and culture
Cypriot society in the Lusignan period was multi-ethnic, with Orthodox Greek Cypriots making up the majority of the population Greeks constituted the majority of the population in the rural areas, where they were either serfs (paroikoi) or free tenants (francomati). The population increased until the middle of the fourteenth century, but the Black Death in 1347-48 resulted in the loss of one fifth to one third of the population. Repeated outbreaks prevented population recovery into the fifteenth century.

The Roman Catholic Latins never exceeded one fourth of the island's population and were concentrated in the cities. Frankish knights and aristocracy mostly lived in Nicosia, whilst Italians were concentrated in Famagusta. The losses suffered by the Crusader States in the 1270s and 1280s and the final Fall of Acre in 1291 triggered an influx of Latin immigrants from the Levant, as Italian, Aragonese and Provençal trading cities relocated their merchants to Cyprus. Maronites, Armenians and Syrians were concentrated in the foothills of Pentadaktylos and coastal plains. There was a system of ethnic discrimination and social stratification in place. However, with the majority of the population being Greeks, the Frankish nobility set up a system that would accommodate a certain degree of Greek autonomy, for instance maintaining Greek ecclesiastical courts open to the consultation of "wise and prominent men", thus practically forming secular Greek forms that exercised a form of judicial autonomy. The Greek Cypriot dialect was used as the lingua franca on the island and legal texts were translated into the vernacular. This relative autonomy meant that there were no rebellions of ethnic character in the Lusignan period. Whilst Greek historiography has traditionally seen a peasant revolt in 1426-27 as a nationalistic uprising, this was an unsystematic series of riots of pillaging by segments of the Greek peasant population and Spanish mercenaries following the Mamluk invasion, the capture of King Janus and the political vacuum that ensued.

List of monarchs of Cyprus

House of Lusignan
 Guy (1192–1194)
 Aimery (1194–1205)
 Hugh I (1205–1218)
 Henry I (1218–1253) (Le Gros)
 Hugh II (1253–1267) (Huguet)
 Hugh III (1267–1284) (the Great)
 John I (1284–1285)
 Henry II (1285–1324)
 Amalric of Tyre (1306–1310), regent
 Hugh IV (1324–1358)
 Peter I (1358–1369)
 Peter II (1369–1382) (Le Gros)
 James I (1382–1398)
 Janus (1398–1432)
 John II (1432–1458)
 Charlotte (1458–1464, and co-ruler 1459–1464 with her husband Louis of Savoy)
 James II (1464–1473) (Le Bâtard)
 James III (1473–1474)
 Catherine Cornaro (1474–1489)

Pretenders of the Kingdom of Cyprus
 Thierry of Flanders, who married the "damsel of Cyprus", heiress of Isaac Komnenos, in the winter of 1202/1203, claimed the kingdom, but Aimery refused to surrender it.
 Eugene Matteo de Armenia (1480's–1523), said by his own progeny to have been an illegitimate son of King James II of Cyprus and if born in the 1480s he was quite a posthumous specimen, alleged to have moved to Sicily then Malta, founder of the family of Baron di Baccari (Tal-Baqqar).
 Charlotte (d. 1487) and Louis (d. 1482), queen and king-consort, continued as pretenders, Charlotte renounced 1482 in favour of: 
 Charles I of Savoy (1482–1490), legitimate great-grandson of Janus of Cyprus, son of a first cousin of Charlotte, second cousin of James III, nephew of Louis
 Charles II of Savoy (1490–1496)
 Yolande Louise of Savoy (1496–1499) and Philibert II of Savoy (d. 1504)
 Philip II of Savoy (1496–1497), father of Philibert II, great-uncle of Charles II and of Yolande Louise, first cousin of Charlotte, maternal grandson of Janus of Cyprus.
 and several others. The rights diverted de jure, but were claimed by the male line. See further under Cypriot claimants under Kings of Jerusalem. By 1476, the various claims were so diverse and weak that various monarchs sought former Cypriot queens to cede them their rights. Even the Republic of Venice briefly entertained the idea of setting up Anthony Woodville, 2nd Earl Rivers, the brother-in-law of England's King Edward IV (who was secretly negotiating a marriage to the Scottish princess Cecilia on Anthony's behalf), as a claimant by purchasing the rights of former Cypriot queens Charlotte and Catarina Cornaro. A convention in Venice of 1476 declared "Anthony Arnite" heir to the combined kingdom of Jerusalem-Cyprus but this came to nought when Anthony died before even his marriage to the sister of James Stewart, King of Scots could be celebrated, and the former Cypriot queens ceded their rights elsewhere. Charlotte to the Italian house of Savoy and Catarina Cornaro to the Most Serene Republic of Venice which asserted its claim to the kingdom as part of the republic, without even a candidate for king.

Titles of the Kings of Cyprus
 King of Cyprus
 King of Jerusalem
 Lord of the Mountains

See also
 Grand Officers of the Kingdom of Cyprus

References

Further reading
 Carr, Annemarie (1995). Art in the Court of the Lusignan Kings
 Coureas, Nicholas (2016). Latin Cyprus and its Relations with the Mamluk Sultanate, 1250-1517
 Coureas, Nicholas (2017). The Lusignan Kingdom of Cyprus and the Sea 13th-15th Centuries

External links
 

 
Former kingdoms
Former monarchies of Asia
Former monarchies of Europe
Cyprus
States and territories established in 1192
States and territories disestablished in 1489
Kingdom of Cyprus
Kingdom of Cyprus
Kingdom of Cyprus
Island countries